John E. Jackson is an American make-up artist who won at the 75th Academy Awards for the film Frida. This was in the category of Best Makeup. He shared his win with Beatrice De Alba.

Selected filmography

The Town (2010)
Gone Baby Gone (2007)
Sky High (2005)
Frida (2002)
American History X (1998)
Austin Powers: International Man of Mystery (1997)
Ace Ventura: When Nature Calls (1994)

References

External links

Living people
American make-up artists
Best Makeup Academy Award winners
Best Makeup BAFTA Award winners
Emmy Award winners
Year of birth missing (living people)
Place of birth missing (living people)